The Portsmouth Square pedestrian bridge is a prominent architectural landmark in Chinatown, San Francisco that spans over Kearny Street from Portsmouth Square to the second floor and third floor of the Hilton San Francisco Financial District hotel, which houses the Chinese Culture Center of San Francisco.

While the bridge is ostensibly meant for pedestrian access to cross the road to the Chinese Culture Center, surveys show that it is rarely used as such, and it gets denigrated by some residents as a "bridge to nowhere." Nevertheless, its brutalist architectural elements and banked sides have made it an attractive space for street skateboarders, from whom it has seen continuous use since the late 1970s, and has been a mainstay in skate media. Skateboarders colloquially call it China Banks. It is also used as a public and private community space.

The bridge is currently under consideration for being demolished as part of a complete redesign of Portsmouth Square.

History

From 1959 until 1963, Portsmouth Square was redesigned as a public park for the Chinatown community. Meanwhile, the Hilton San Francisco Financial District was built across the street (initially as a Holiday Inn but was later purchase by Hilton Hotels & Resorts). A bridge connecting the two was included in some of the hotel's initial designs. The city gave approval to build the bridge in 1970. Construction on the bridge began that same year, and it was opened in 1971. The bridge was created as a privately owned space that allowed for public access. The air rights for the bridge are owned by Justice Investors, one of the companies that owns the Hilton Hotel property. While the bridge is private property, its permit is "revocable at the will of the Board of Supervisors."

A second redesign of the square began in a first phase the 1980s and a second phase in the 1990s. During the second phase of that redesign, a community room was built which was connected to the bridge on the underside of the east side. It was opened to the public in 2001.

A redesign of the bridge was announced in 2015, where it was stated that public access would be increased and new benches and planters would be built on the bridge. However, this plan was not realized.

Proposed demolition
In 2014, the San Francisco Recreation & Parks Department conducted a feasibility study for redesigning and upgrading Portsmouth Square. Designs were drawn up, and in 2021 it was publicly announced that the bridge would be removed as part of the redesign. It was estimated that it would cost $2.1 million project to dismantle the bridge. The permit with the city states that it would be the Hilton Hotel's responsibility to remove the bridge. David Gonzalez, president of the hotel's owner Portsmouth Square Inc., said that the hotel did not want to pay to demolish the bridge.

A survey found that 77% of residents of Chinatown never use the bridge, and some people have said that the Hilton hotel sometimes treats it like a private space, rather than public, and closes it on Sundays and during private dining events. As such, many Chinatown residents support the  removal of the bridge, but some people oppose it, including skateboarders and appreciators of Brutalist architecture. Sam Kwong, a local architect, also opposes the demolition as he says removing it will create bad feng shui. Meanwhile, better pedestrian access for that block is necessary as the street intersections on either side of the bridge are some of the most dangerous for pedestrians.

If the redevelopment proceeds, the historic skate spot would be lost.

In January 2023, renderings of the redesign of the area without the bridge were publicly revealed. They showed a small section of the bridge connected to the hotel will remain which will continue to form a porte cochere and offer a balcony for the hotel.

Design

The bridge was a project of the San Francisco Redevelopment Agency. It is made from concrete and brick and represents a stylistic extension of the Hilton Hotel that it spans to, both of which fit into Brutalist architecture. Across it are lights that are enclosed in bronze geometric shapes that depict Chinese symbols and are meant to bring to mind chinese lanterns.

The hotel was designed by Chinese American architect Clement Chen and John Carl Warnecke and Associates, and the bridge was originally going to be two levels and incorporated into the design. However, by late 1967, the double-decker bridge concept was discarded in favor of a single level bridge. The design of the bridge was done by American landscape architect Robert Royston and Taiwanese architect Chen Chi-kwan. Clement Chen later stated the bridge design was inspired by the Anji Bridge. On the east end of the bridge are two sets of stairs leading up to the third floor of the hotel. The bridge creates a porte cochere.

One problem of the bridge is the shadows it casts. This problem was noted in the original designs, which required moving the previously existing playground.

No major renovations have been done to the bridge itself since its erection. However, several minor changes have been made. For example, a metal gate was built on the west end of bridge in 2003 at a cost of $5,000 to allow the Hilton to restrict public access when desired. In July 2014, a permit was requested and granted by the city to erect four flagpoles on the east side of the bridge outside the Chinese Culture Center. In response to skateboarders using the bridge, hostile architectural elements were installed, such as skatestoppers on the benches, and an additional railing on the ramp part of the staircase.

Portsmouth Square was evaluated in 2019 for inclusion in the California Register of Historical Resources, during which the bridge was also determined to be eligible for historic designation by itself. The evaluation stated that the bridge was a "character defining feature" of the block.

Use

Skate spot

Not long after it was built, the bridge became a local skate spot. Thrasher Skateboard Magazine documented it in the 2022 film The Story of China Banks. In it, Mike "Arco" Archimedes discusses the "discovery" of the site in 1979. The skate spot is one of the most famous in the world and has been called "iconic", a "San Francisco staple", "skate mecca", and skateboarding's "most hallowed ground." It is also used by freestyle BMX riders. For example, Danny MacAskill filmed a portion of a Red Bull video on the bridge in 2022. In addition to other local skate spots, such as EMB, the spot is considered among the most important in the development of modern street skating in the 1990s.

The skate spot has been featured in many skate videos, such as the influential The Search for Animal Chin. Many popular skate stunts have been performed there, including Joe Valdez doing an ollie on the ledge of the bridge over the street below, a 35-foot drop, in 2014. Finnish Olympic skateboarder Jarne Verbruggen skated the site. The cover of the December 2021 edition of Thrasher Magazine was a photo of skateboarder Tristan Funkhouser ollieing over the largest bench on the bridge.

In response to skateboarders using the bridge, security and police presence was stepped up in the 90s and hostile architectural elements were installed. According to The Story of China Banks, skateboarders were initially deterred a little by this, but eventually continued to use the site.

Influence
The location has inspired a new skate feature, called "China banks," which is a sloped quarter pipe-like bank with ledges in front and is featured at a number of skateparks and skate competitions around the world, including skateparks in Eveleigh, New South Wales, Australia, Tampa, Florida, Los Angeles, Scantlebury Skate Park in New Haven, Connecticut, Bangkok, Thailand, Solana Beach, California, Marrakesh, Morocco, and others. Skate company Vans opened a skatepark and event center in Chicago, Illinois called the House of Vans which has a replica of the bridge, and other famous skate spots. A popular skate spot in New York's Chinatown also has a similar feature and is called China Banks in reference to this one. When Thrasher opened their brick-and-mortar store on 6th Street, it was meant to partly serve as a commemoration to the history and culture of skateboarding in San Francisco; as part of that, it featured photos and clothing featuring China Banks. Duncan McDuie-Ra, a professor of Urban Sociology at The University of Newcastle, has published books on famous skate spots and has documented China Banks.

Community use

The Hilton hotel sometimes uses it for private events. It also sees occasional public community use as an extension of Portsmouth Square, Chinatown's "living room." The Portsmouth Square Clubhouse, a community room connected beneath the bridge, is rarely used.

As an art space

The Chinese Culture Center began having temporary projects and performances on the bridge in the 2000s.

In 2015, an art exhibit was installed on the bridge called "Sky Bridge." It consisted of reflective mylar on the bricks.

Along the stairs on the east side of the bridge, a mosaic titled "Sunrise" by artist Mik Gaspay and was created and officially debuted in 2016. It is still on display today.

In media

Skate media

 Thrasher Magazine's Blast from the Past and Present, 1986
 The Search for Animal Chin, 1987
 Toy Machine's Welcome to Hell, 1996
 Anti Hero's Fucktards, 1997
 Santa Cruz Skateboards' Hillbombs and Classic Spots: Cruzin' SF w/ Jereme Knibbs , 2020 
 Red Bull's Danny MacAskill: Postcard from San Francisco, 2022
 Thrasher Magazine's Deep Fried X Baker, 2022

Video games
The skateboarding video game Tony Hawk's Pro Skater had a level of San Francisco which featured the bridge.

The bridge is a location in the skateboarding video game Session: Skate Sim.

The bridge is present in the game Driver: San Francisco.

Music
Skate rock band Hot Lunch has a song about the skate spot called "China Banks."

Movies
In the 1971 film Dirty Harry, the bridge and other nearby landmarks (such as the Hilton Hotel and Portsmouth Square) are seen in various scenes.

References

Chinatown, San Francisco
Brutalist architecture in California
Pedestrian bridges in California
Skateboarding spots